Apple Panic is a game for the Apple II programmed by Ben Serki and published by Broderbund Software in 1981. Apple Panic is an unauthorized version of the 1980 arcade game Space Panic, the first game with ladders and platforms. While the arcade original remained obscure, Apple Panic became a top seller for home computers. It was ported to the Atari 8-bit family, VIC-20, IBM PC (as a self-booting disk), and TRS-80.

Gameplay

The player controls a character that walks left and right along platforms made of green brick and climbs up and down ladders between them. The player can use a shovel to dig holes through the platforms, into which enemies will fall and become trapped. Once an enemy is stuck in a hole, the player must strike it repeatedly with the shovel until it falls through and hits the level below.  This must be done quickly, because after about 17 seconds an enemy will be able to free itself, filling in the hole in the process. The player can also refill holes they've dug, or drop through them.

There are three types of enemy in the game, the first and most numerous being the "apples". An apple will die if it falls at a single level. As the player advances, green and blue enemies will start to appear, which must be dropped through at least two or three levels, respectively. This is accomplished by digging a series of holes, one directly below another, and trapping the enemy in the uppermost hole. The player earns extra points if they drop one monster on top of another (killing them both).

On each level, the player has only a limited time to dispatch all the enemies, tracked by a bar at the bottom of the screen.  There are four distinct configurations of platforms and ladders through which the game cycles, but in every one there will always be five platforms in which the player can dig.

Ports
Ports for the Atari 8-bit family and IBM PC (as a self-booting disk) were done by Olaf Lubeck, who also wrote Cannonball Blitz for the Apple II. A TRS-80 version was programmed by Yves Lempereur and published by Funsoft.

Reception
In contrast to Space Panics lack of success in the arcades, Apple Panic was very successful on home computers. Debuting in July 1981, the game sold 15,000 copies by June 1982, appearing on Computer Gaming Worlds list of top sellers. Softline reported in 1983 that it was among the top 30 best-selling Apple software for almost two years, in contrast to the "two to four month life span" of the typical arcade game. Electronic Games described Apple Panic in 1983 as "deliciously true to" the gameplay of Space Panic.

Dick McGrath reviewed the game for Computer Gaming World, and decided that the game gets a 4 on a scale of 1 to 10, and stated that "After playing Time Runner, Apple Panic creates a deja-vu, I've-been-here-before."

Byte in 1982 called it "one of the most creative and novel games to be invented for a microcomputer". PC Magazine in 1983 stated "Yes, Apple Panic is a pretty dumb game. It's also fun to play and pretty to watch ... a welcome change from the endless stream of shoot-em-ups in space".

Owen Linzmayer reviewing the TRS-80 version for Creative Computing wrote, "The Apple Panic packaging promises voice and sound effects. This is a bit misleading. The only time the computer speaks (through the AUX port), is when it displays the banner page. At this time, it says only two words, 'Apple Panic'." He concluded, "Apple Panic from Funsoft may be well on its way to the top of the charts." Computer Games magazine gave the VIC-20 version a B rating, noting that it is "a slightly revised version" of Space Panic and stating that it is "better than the Apple game."

References

External links
 Apple Panic at Atari Mania
 Clone written in the Seed7 programming language.

1981 video games
Apple II games
Atari 8-bit family games
Broderbund games
VIC-20 games
Unauthorized video games
Platform games
Video game clones
Video games developed in the United States